George Henry Roberts (27 July 1868 – 25 April 1928) was a Labour Party politician who switched parties twice.

Biography
He was born on 27 July 1868.

At the 1906 general election, he was elected as Member of Parliament (MP) for Norwich. He was a minister in the Lloyd George Coalition Government as Parliamentary Secretary to the Board of Trade from 1916 to 1917, Minister of Labour from 1917 to 1919, and Minister of Food Control from 1919 to 1920.  He was appointed as a Privy Counsellor in 1917.

Roberts stood in 1918 as a Coalition Labour candidate, opposed by the official Labour Party candidate. After leaving office in 1920, Roberts returned as a director to the firm he had left as works manager upon entering Parliament in 1906. He sat on the back-benches and as an independent retained his seat in the 1922 election but lost it as the Conservative candidate in 1923. Roberts spent the rest of his life in the sugar beet industry.

He died on 25 April 1928.

References

Bibliography
Meeres, Frank. George Roberts MP. A Life That 'Did Different'. (Poppyland Publishing, 2019)

External links 
 

1868 births
1928 deaths
Labour Party (UK) MPs for English constituencies
Members of the Parliament of the United Kingdom for Norwich
Members of the Privy Council of the United Kingdom
Typographical Association-sponsored MPs
UK MPs 1906–1910
UK MPs 1910
UK MPs 1910–1918
UK MPs 1918–1922
UK MPs 1922–1923
Coalition Labour MPs
Chairs of the Labour Party (UK)
Conservative Party (UK) parliamentary candidates
Parliamentary Secretaries to the Board of Trade
Independent members of the House of Commons of the United Kingdom